Laizure Glacier is a broad glacier that enters the sea immediately west of Drake Head, Oates Coast, Antarctica. The glacier was roughly plotted by Australia from U.S. Navy Operation Highjump photography, 1946–47, and from photographs and other data obtained by Australian National Antarctic Research Expeditions, 1959–62. It was mapped in detail by the United States Geological Survey from surveys and U.S. Navy photography, 1960–64, and was named by the Advisory Committee on Antarctic Names for Lieutenant David H. Laizure, U.S. Navy, a navigator on LC-130 aircraft during Operation Deep Freeze 1968.

References

Glaciers of Oates Land